Neue Rechte (New Right) is the designation for a right-wing political movement in Germany. It was founded as an opposition to the New Left generation of the 1960s. Its intellectually oriented proponents distance themselves from Old Right Nazi traditions and emphasize similarities between the far-right and the conservative spectrum.

A common denominator of the Neue Rechte is a skeptical or negative stance towards the basic tenets of the German constitution, often in the sense of an ethnic (völkisch) nationalism.

History
When in 1964 the far-right National Democratic Party of Germany (NPD) was founded, its younger members began to call themselves Junge Rechte, in order to differ from Nazi models and to counter the German student movement. Contrary to their hopes, the NPD failed to enter the Bundestag parliament in the 1969 federal elections, whereafter they initiated a far-right renewal movement. In 1972, Henning Eichberg drafted the policy declaration of the Aktion Neue Rechte offshoot, conveying ideas of an 'anti-imperialistic liberation nationalism', which included the expulsion of the Allied 'occupying forces' to pave the way for German unification and national rebirth.

From 1974, the movement disintegrated into numerous splinter groups, some defending the traditional ideas of a German Volksgemeinschaft, some affiliating to the rising ecology movement. Eichberg and his followers continued to fight an 'over-foreignization' (Überfremdung) by the superpowers and advocated a Third Position in opposition to both capitalism and communism. They made attempts to build up ties to left-wing sectarian and ecological groups, as well as to the German peace movement.

About 1980, a new tendency arose to approach the ideas of the French Nouvelle Droite and its founder Alain de Benoist. The adherents stressed the perspective of a pan-European 'cultural struggle'; their concepts were embodied by the foundation of the Thule-Seminar as the German branch of the French Groupement de recherche et d'études pour la civilisation européenne (GRECE). In the late 1980s, proponents of a national revolutionary movement attempted to infiltrate right-wing populist parties like The Republicans, while other associated with the national liberal spectrum.

The movement gained a new momentum in the course of German reunification. The rise of right-wing parties as The Republicans led by Franz Schönhuber, the Pro Movement, and the Alternative for Germany (AfD) is a matter of ongoing debate among German political scientists. They draw parallels to the success of European parties such as the Italian Alleanza Nazionale and the Lega Nord, the Freedom Party of Austria (FPÖ), the French Front National, the Swiss People's Party (SVP) or the Belgian Vlaams Belang as well as to the US Tea Party movement. The programmatic statements of 'New Right' parties span from neoliberal to far-right elements and thereby have become compatible to conservative and liberal circles.

Ideology
Historically, the Neue Rechte is linked to the positions of right-wing Ideologues in the Weimar Republic, later summarized under the heading 'Conservative Revolution' by writers like Armin Mohler. These forces included such people as Arthur Moeller van den Bruck (Das Dritte Reich), Carl Schmitt, Edgar Julius Jung, Ernst Jünger, Oswald Spengler (The Decline of the West) and Ernst von Salomon. During the interwar period, they openly rejected Marxism as well as liberalism and the parliamentary system in favour of an authoritarian regime and a German Sonderweg. Their views towards rising Nazism remained ambivalent, nevertheless they contributed to the fierce political infighting that preceded the Nazi seizure of power in 1933.

Several members of the Neue Rechte also refer to theorists like Georges Sorel, Vilfredo Pareto, Robert Michels, Julius Evola, and José Antonio Primo de Rivera seen as fascist pioneers. Some even base themselves on Marxist philosophers like Antonio Gramsci and his ideas of cultural hegemony.

Textually, the Neue Rechte challenges the principles of the Enlightenment, such as pluralism and social equality underlying the doctrine of human rights. Racist elements are superseded by the concept of ethnopluralism, combining both neoconservative and far-right approaches. Ideologists disparage the ideals of the 1968 protests and feminism, they refuse to accept a multicultural society and seek for a strengthened 'national identity'. Therefore, they tend to historical revisionism and to battle against what they call a German 'cult of guilt' with regard to The Holocaust. According to Roger Griffin, the Neue Rechte share the deep cultural pessimism of their precursors in the interwar period. Referring to a völkisch nationalism, the movement seeks refuge not in the restoration of traditional values, but in a 'national rebirth' according to palingenetic concepts.

They parallel the French Nouvelle Droite as a political movement, somewhat similar in their general political stance including the Anti-American sentiment advocated by Alain de Benoist. However, the Nouvelle Droite'''s neo-pagan leanings are the opposite to the Christian foundation of many Neue Rechte members, though the movement also comprises occult groups.

So far, the Neue Rechte movement has not achieved an integrated opposite position to Western liberalism: while a main neoconservative tendency strongly refers to pre-war traditions and even affect centre-right parties, a second wing openly uses terms like "revolution" or "socialism" in political disputes, based on the model of Ernst Niekisch and Strasserist concepts. They have made attempts to build up a Querfront strategy with originally 'left' anti-imperialist and anti-capitalist circles.

Networks
Well-known scholars and influential figures of the Neue Rechte beside Henning Eichberg and Armin Mohler include Gerd-Klaus Kaltenbrunner, Hans-Dietrich Sander, Robert Hepp, Caspar von Schrenck-Notzing, Karlheinz Weissmann and Götz Kubitschek.

The medium commonly associated with the Neue Rechte is the weekly newspaper Junge Freiheit founded in 1986. However, its chief editor Dieter Stein, a former member of The Republicans, denounces the term and instead advocates a more traditionally Christian, yet decidedly nationalist and democratic conservatism. Yet the term is frequently used as a self-description by the bi-monthly magazine Sezession, which is closely linked to Junge Freiheit. Other periodicals affiliated with the Neue Rechte are Nation und Europa (discontinued in 2009) and its Zuerst! successor. The Studienzentrum Weikersheim founded by the CDU politician Hans Filbinger considers itself a Christian-conservative think tank.

The Bibliothek des Konservatismus (BdK) is another connecting element in the network of the far-right in central Europe. Opened in 2012 and located in Fasanenstraße in Berlin-Charlottenburg the main focus of the library is conservative and far-right literature. It is the first library with this content in Germany and was founded by Caspar von Schrenck-Notzing and his foundation Förderstiftung konservative Bildung und Forschung (FKBF). FKBF is running the library. There are 27.000 medias (2014) in the library.

References

 Further reading 
 
 Minkenberg, Michael, Die Neue Radikale Rechte im Vergleich: USA, Frankreich, Deutschland, Opladen: Westdt. Verl. 1998, 411 S.,  
 Jay Julian Rosellini, The German New Right: AfD, PEGIDA, and the Re-imagining of German Identity (London: Hurst Publishers, 2019).
 
 Roger Woods, Germany's New Right as Culture and Politics'' (Basingstoke and New York: Palgrave Macmillan, 2007).

External links 
 Introduction to the history of German Neue Rechte

Conservatism in Germany
German nationalism
New Right (Europe)
Anti-American sentiment in Germany